Merryfield Lane Halt is a railway station at the summit of the East Somerset Railway. It was built in 1981 and originally served as the terminus of the railway.

Services

Nearly all regular services stop at Merryfield Lane, with a wait of 20 minutes between the outward and return journeys.

Facilities

There is a picnic area adjacent to the platform as well as a small hut and benches.

References

External links
East Somerset Railway Website

Heritage railway stations in Somerset
Railway stations built for UK heritage railways